Dimethylstilbestrol (DMS) is a nonsteroidal estrogen of the stilbestrol group related to diethylstilbestrol which was never marketed. It is a so-called "weak", "impeded", or "short-acting" estrogen similarly to estriol and meso-butoestrol. The affinity of DMS for the ER was reported as about 10% of that of estradiol. For comparison, diethylstilbestrol had 140% of the affinity of estradiol for the ER.

The endometrial proliferation dose of DMS in women is 20 mg. A single 12 mg intramuscular injection of DMS has a duration of approximately 12 days in humans.

References

Abandoned drugs
Phenols
Stilbenoids
Synthetic estrogens